Chris Anderson is a groundworker and a British Army veteran, best known for winning the annual cheese rolling at Cooper's Hill in Gloucestershire a record 23 times. Chris is sponsored by Spa Security Ltd.

Biography 
Chris Anderson is a former light infantryman in the 1st Battalion, The Rifles of the British Army. He comes from Brockworth, the village in Gloucestershire at the foot of Cooper's Hill, venue for the cheese rolling races.

Anderson first competed in the annual cheese rolling in 2004 at the age of 17 and came second. He won his first race in 2005 and beat the record, held by Stephen Gyde, in 2018. In his 14 years of competition he has suffered a broken ankle, concussion, a torn calf muscle and bruised kidneys.

Despite taking home 22 Double Gloucester cheeses, he only likes cheddar. After winning three races in 2017, he auctioned one of his three cheeses for a charity in aid of the condition Nonketotic Hyperglycinemia (NKH).

Anderson believes that the secret to winning the cheese rolling is to stay on your feet and not fall over. However, footage of him winning the cheese rolling for a record 21st time reveals that he does in fact fall over, but has a particular talent for getting up swiftly, propelling himself down the hill in a single seamless movement while fallers behind roll multiple times before coming to a stop.
Anderson has now announced his retirement from running the hill but will be back to watch the event and to offer tips to anyone who dares take on the magnificent Cooper's Hill.

Cheese rolling record 
 2005 1 win. 
 2006 1 win. 
 2007 1 win. 
 2008 1 win. 
 2009 2 wins. 
 2010 2 wins. 
 2011 3 wins.
 2012 2 wins.
 2015 2 wins.
 2016 2 wins.
 2017 3 wins.
 2018 2 wins.
 2022 1 win.

References

Living people
Sportspeople from Gloucestershire
Year of birth missing (living people)
Place of birth missing (living people)